The English words Daoism and Taoism ( or ) are alternative spellings for the same-named Chinese philosophy and religion. The root for Daoism or Taoism is the Chinese word 道 ("road" or "way"), which was transcribed tao or tau in the earliest systems for the romanization of Chinese and dao or dau in 20th century systems.

Phonology
In order to explain why English Taoism might be pronounced, it is necessary to introduce some technical terminology from linguistics. A phoneme is the smallest unit of speech sounds that a particular language distinguishes, and unrelated languages can have disparate phonemic inventories.

As a result, phonemic gaps can affect borrowed words. English has  and  consonants and Chinese has  but not , thus, Chinese uses /l-/ to transcribe both /l-/ and /r-/ English loanwords; for example, léishè 雷射 "laser" and léidá 雷達 "radar". Conversely, Japanese has the /r-/ phoneme but not /l-/, with borrowings of rēza レーザ and rēdā レーダー.

In phonetics, the consonant of Chinese tao or dào 道 is classified as an unaspirated denti-alveolar stop. Aspiration is articulation that involves an audible puff of breath; for example, the /t/ in English tore  is aspirated with a burst of air while the /t/ in store  is unaspirated. The IPA symbol for aspiration is a superscript "h",  (e.g.), and the optional diacritic for unaspiration is a superscript equals sign "=",  (e.g.). A stop consonant or oral occlusive is a consonant in which the speaker blocks the vocal tract so that all airflow ceases, and a denti-alveolar consonant is articulated with a flat tongue against the alveolar ridge and upper teeth.

The present Chinese unaspirated denti-alveolar stop in pinyin dào 道 is commonly transcribed with the IPA symbol [], although some linguists prefer using  with the voiceless under-ring diacritic. The sinologist and phonologist Jerry Norman explains the reason for using  instead of [t] for Pinyin d. Chinese stops and affricates fall into two contrasting unaspirated and aspirated series. The unaspirated series (b, d, g, etc.) is lenis, and "often gives the impression of being voiced to the untrained ear", while the aspirated series (p, t, k, etc.) is strongly aspirated (1988:139). Standard Chinese phonology uses aspiration for the contrastive distribution of consonantal stops. For example, phonemically differentiating the unaspirated denti-alveolar stop // with the aspirated denti-alveolar stop //, as in unaspirated dào or // 道 "way" and aspirated tào or // 套 "sheath; case; cover".

Instead of aspiration, English phonology primarily contrasts stop consonants by voicing, that is, the vocal cords vibrate in a voiced sound but not in a voiceless or unvoiced one. The voiced stops (and ) are in contrastive distribution with voiceless (and ) in English. Voiced stops are usually unaspirated and voiceless stops are sometimes aspirated. There are six voiceless plosives in Chinese: simple and aspirated p p', t t', k k', which would correspond to English voiceless and voiced p b, t d, k g. The six Chinese plosives are generally rendered by English p t k, for instance, simple t in moutan, and Tanka, and aspirated t' in fantan and twankay (Yuan 1981: 251).

In English, aspiration is allophonic, meaning multiple alternative pronunciations for a single phoneme in a particular language. English-speakers treat them as the same sound, but they are phonetically different, the first is aspirated and the second is unaspirated.

Phonological rules can miss the point when it comes to loanwords, which are borrowings that move from a language with one set of well-formedness conditions to a language with a different set, with the result that adjustments have to be made to meet the new constraints (Yip 1993:262). Coming back to the Chinese unaspirated denti-alveolar stop  in pinyin dào 道, this speech sound exists in English—but never as the stressed first syllable in a word. Unaspirated  occurs instead in words such as "stop" or "pat" as a complementary /t/ allophone of the aspirated  initial t in English, such as in "tap". Owing to the linguistic difference between the Chinese aspirated /tʰ/ vs. unaspirated /t/ phonemic contrast and English voiced /d/ vs. unvoiced /t/ phonemic contrast, an English speaker who is unfamiliar with Chinese romanization will likely pronounce Dao with the voiced alveolar stop  and Tao with the voiceless alveolar stop . Thus, the Chinese unaspirated  phoneme in dào 道 /taʊ/ is nearer to the pronunciation of English voiced unaspirated  in Dow /daʊ/ than the voiceless aspirated  in Taos [taʊs], but it is neither (Carr 1990: 60).

Romanizations
Scholars have been developing Chinese romanization systems for four centuries, and the unaspirated  道 "road; way" has many transcriptions.

Jesuit missionaries in China recorded the earliest romanizations of /taʊ/ 道. The first bilingual Chinese dictionary in a Western language, Michele Ruggieri's and Matteo Ricci's Portuguese 1583–1588 Dicionário Português-Chinês or Pú-Hàn cídiǎn 葡漢辭典 (Yong and Peng 2008: 385), transcribed /taʊ/ as "táo" (Witek 2001: 190). The Latin 1615 De Christiana expeditione apud Sinas, compiled by Matteo Ricci and Nicolas Trigault, romanized it as "tau" in the Chinese term "Tausu" (i.e., Daoshi 道士, "Daoist priest"), which Samuel Purchas's 1625 English translation gave as "Tausa" (XII: 461).

During the 19th and 20th centuries, new and revised Chinese romanization schemes flourished. The Standard Chinese pronunciation of 道 is variously transcribed as Wade–Giles tao (or tao4 marking 4th tone), Legge romanization tâo, Latinxua Sin Wenz dau, Gwoyeu Romatzyh daw,  Yale dàu, and Hanyu Pinyin dào. In addition to Latin alphabet romanizations, there are transliterations of Zhuyin fuhao ㄉㄠ and Cyrillic Pallidius System дао. Romanization systems use one of two arbitrary ways to represent the Chinese phonemic opposition between aspirated and unaspirated consonants. Take for example, Chinese unaspirated  道 "way" and aspirated  桃 "peach". Some systems, like Wade–Giles tao 道 and t'ao 桃, introduce a special symbol for aspiration, in this case the Greek rough breathing diacritic (῾) indicating  before a vowel; others, like Pinyin dao 道 and tao 桃, use "d" and "t". In English and other languages, "d" and "t" indicate a voiced and unvoiced distinction, which is not phonemic in Chinese (Carr 1990: 59).

While many scholars prefer the more familiar spelling "Taoism", arguing that it is now an English word in its own right, the term "Daoism" is becoming increasingly popular.  In one work, "Daoism" was preferred to "Taoism" principally for technical, phonological and conventional reasons, but also because it was thought the modern term "Daoism" helped highlight a departure from earlier Western interpretations of the philosophy (Girardot, Miller, and Liu 2001: xxxi).  Miller later added that "Daoism" is his preferred usage as a distinction "from what 'Taoism' represented in the 20th-century Western imagination" (Miller 2008: xiii).  One commentator, who goes beyond the spelling distinction between Orientalist "Taoism" and academic "Daoism", discriminates "Taoism" with its common voiced /ˈtaʊ.ɪzəm/ mispronunciation. Having explained that both "Daoism" and "Taoism" are pronounced "with a 'd' sound", i.e., /ˈdaʊ.ɪzəm/, Komjathy describes a new religious movement labeled "American Taoism" or "Popular Western Taoism" (a term coined by Herman 1998) in which "Taoism" is pronounced with a "hard 't' sound", /ˈtaʊ.ɪzəm/ (2014: 1, 206).

Borrowings
Within the lexical set of English words originating from Chinese, the loanword Tao/Dao is more typical than the loanblend Taoism/Daoism. Most Sinitic borrowings in English are loanwords directly transliterated from Chinese (for example, Tao/Dao from dào 道 "way, path; say" or kowtow from kòutóu 叩頭 lit. "knock head"), some are calques or loan translations (brainwashing from xǐnăo 洗腦, lit. "brain wash" or Red Guards from Hóngwèibīng 红卫兵), and a few are hybrid words or loanblends that combine a borrowing with a native element (Taoism/Daoism from Tao/Dao "the Way" and -ism suffix or Peking duck from Běijīng kǎoyā 北京烤鴨 "roast Beijing duck"). Besides English Taoism/Daoism, other common -ism borrowings include Confucianism, Mohism, and Maoism. While most Chinese loanwords have a "foreign appearance", monosyllabic ones such as li or tong are more likely to remain "alien" than loanblends with English elements such as Taoism or tangram that are more readily "naturalized" (Yuan 1981: 250).

The Oxford English Dictionary (2nd ed.) records the progression of occurrences over the succeeding centuries:  Tao 1736, Tau 1747, Taouism and Taouist 1838, Taoistic 1856, Tao-ism 1858, Taoism 1903, Daoism 1948, Dao and Daoist 1971.

Linguists distinguish between hypercorrection, the erroneous use of a nonstandard word form due to a belief that it is more accurate than the corresponding standard form (for instance, the /fra:ns/ pronunciation for France /fræns/), and hyperforeignism, the misapplication of foreign loanword pronunciation patterns extended beyond their use in the original language (such as dropping the "t" in claret /ˈklærɪt/). Taoism is neither a hypercorrection because it originated from a spelling misunderstanding rather than a phonemic modification, nor a hyperforeignism because it is not an attempt to sound more Chinese (Carr 1990: 68).

Wade–Giles I Ching and T'ai Chi Ch'üan (Pinyin Yìjīng and Tàijíquán) are two common cases in which the Pinyin romanization more accurately represents Chinese pronunciation than Wade–Giles (Carr 1990: 67-68). I Ching transcribes the Chinese /i  t͡ɕiŋ/ 易經 Book of Changes, but some English speakers pronounce it /ˈaɪ tʃiːŋ/, reading Chinese I /i/ as the English pronoun I /aɪ/ and the aspirated alveolo-palatal Ch /  t͡ɕʰ/ as the fortis postalveolar /tʃ/. The T'ai Chi Ch'üan martial art /tʰaɪ̯   t͡ɕi   t͡ɕʰy̯ɛn/ 太极拳 is commonly misspelled Tai Chi Chuan (Pinyin Daijizhuan) without umlaut or apostrophes (the Wikipedia article is titled Tai chi), and is similarly naturalized as English /ˌtaɪ ˌtʃi ˈtʃwɑn/.

Lexicography
English dictionaries provide some insights into the Daoism/Taoism pronunciation issue.

One scholar analyzed Taoism pronunciation glosses in general-purpose English dictionaries, comparing twelve published in Great Britain (1933–1989) and eleven published in the United States (1948–1987). After standardizing the various dictionary respelling systems into the International Phonetic Alphabet, there are four types of Taoism glosses involving prescriptive linguistics and descriptive linguistics: is prescriptively accurate, describes a common distortion, and the alternate and  glosses are more comprehensive (Carr 1990: 63–64).

The eleven American-English references haves more varied glosses: six times, twice, twice, and  once (OAD, 1979). The respective first accurate American and British lexicographic glosses for Taoism were "douizm; tou-" (Webster's Second, 1934) and "Also Daoism and with pronunc. (dau•iz'm)" (OED supplement, 1986).

Besides and  pronunciation variations for the consonant T in Taoism, the dictionaries also glosses the vocalic diphthong as (//), (//), and the triphthong (//), which may be owing to the old Taouism, Tauism, and Tavism variant spellings (Carr 1990: 64). For instance, the 1989 OED2 mixed gloss "(ˈtɑːəʊɪz(ə)m, ˈdaʊɪz(ə)m)" combines the (//) pronunciation from the 1933 OED1 Taoism entry and the (}) from the 1986 OED supplement.

References
 Carr, Michael. 1990. "Whence the Pronunciation of Taoism?" Dictionaries 12:55–74.
 Cohen, Gerald. 1989. "Gung Ho Revisited, Part 1". Comments on Etymology 29.3:1–42.
Girardot, N. J., James Miller and Liu Xiaogan, eds. 2001. Daoism and Ecology: Ways within a Cosmic Landscape. Harvard University Press.
  (Only snippet view on Google Books)
Herman, Jonathan R. 1998. "Review of Tao Te Ching: A Book About the Way and the Power of the Way". Journal of the American Academy of Religion 66.3: 686–89.
Komjathy, Louis. 2014. Daoism: A Guide for the Perplexed. A&C Black.
Miller, James. 2008. Daoism: A Beginner's Guide. Oneworld Publications.
Norman, Jerry. 1988. Chinese. New York: Cambridge University Press.
Purchas, Samuel. 1625. A discourse of the Kingdome of China, taken out of Ricius and Trigautius, containing the countrey, people, government, religion, rites, sects, characters, studies, arts, acts; and a Map of China added, drawne out of one there made with Annotations for the understanding thereof, found in Hakluytus posthumus, or Purchas His Pilgrimes.
Witek, John W, ed. 2001. Dicionário Português-Chinês, Michele Ruggiero and Matteo Ricci, S. Local, Biblioteca Nacional de Lisboa, IPOR, Ricci Institute, University of San Francisco.
Yip, Moira (1993), "Cantonese Loanword Phonology and Optimality Theory", Journal of East Asian Linguistics 2.3: 261–291.
Yong, Heming and Jing Peng, 2008. Chinese Lexicography: A History from 1046 BC to AD 1911, Oxford University Press.
Yuan Jia Hua (1981), "English Words of Chinese Origin", Journal of Chinese Linguistics 9.2: 244-286

External links
 Daoism or Taoism?, James Miller, Queen's University
 Popular Western Taoism. Louis Komjathy, Center for Daoist Studies
 Why we say "Beizhing" and not "Beijing", Victor H. Mair discusses "Taoism" mispronunciations, Language Log, 2 May 2019

Language comparison
Chinese
Naming controversies
Romanization of Chinese
Standard Chinese
Taoism